Aisha Falode is a sports journalist in Nigeria. She is also the President of Nigeria Women Football League (NWFL). 

Afterwards when Raymond Dokpesi was planning his own broadcasting station now known as the African Independent Television (AIT) that she became involved. This later led her to acquire a graduate degree in Mass Communications. Prior this she also worked briefly with NITEL (Nigerian Telecommunication Limited) and again with the Graduate Telephone Operators Scheme of the then NITEL.

Her success story as a sports journalist stems from her involvement in both sports and radio broadcasting.

In January 2017, she was inaugurated by Nigeria Football Federation as the head of Nigeria Women Football League, the body that organizes Aiteo Cup and Nigeria Women Premier League.

References

External links
I love Jean trousers and T-shirts – Falode

Living people
Nigerian television journalists
Year of birth missing (living people)
Yoruba women journalists
Nigerian women journalists
Women television journalists
21st-century Nigerian women